Maxine Nightingale (born 2 November 1952) is a British R&B and soul music singer. She is best known for her hits in the 1970s, with the million seller "Right Back Where We Started From" (1975, UK #8 & 1976, U.S. #2), "Love Hit Me" (1977), and "Lead Me On" (1979).

Early life/career
One of the three children of Guyanese-born comedian Benny Nightingale and his wife Iris (they also had daughter Rosalind and son Glenn), Maxine Nightingale first sang with her school band: she attended Bryon Primary (in Gillingham, Kent), Ealing Grammar School, and Guildhall School of Music and Drama. At age thirteen, she and a friend visited a neighbourhood house where the band Unisound was rehearsing. They asked her to sing with them and she joined them in performing extensively on the British cabaret circuit. The manager of one of the clubs where they performed asked Nightingale to cut a demo and shipped it to Pye Records, for whom Nightingale made her first recordings. Despite being overseen by label A&R head Cyril Stapleton, Nightingale's three Pye single releases—issued in June and July 1969 and 26 March 1971—went unnoticed.

In 1969 Nightingale began a tenure of roughly 18 months in the West End production of Hair, playing a supporting role and understudying the female lead role of Sheila; she then relocated to Germany, having formed a relationship with an actor from the German production of Hair whom she had met when he visited the West End production. In Germany, Nightingale continued her stage musical career in Hair (as Sheila), Jesus Christ Superstar, and Godspell, and she began a relationship with Minoru Terada Domberger, the director of the German production of Hair, which led to marriage and a daughter, Langka Veva Domberger, born in 1973.

First hit

Nightingale returned to London with her husband and daughter and appeared in the West End production of Savages, after which she withdrew from professional performing. According to Nightingale, "I started doing session singing. I didn't do a lot but it was easy to go out in the evening when the baby was sleeping." Her singing on the recording of Al Matthews' "Fool" caught the attention of the session's producer Pierre Tubbs, and he asked composer J. Vincent Edwards, who had worked with Nightingale in the West End production of Hair, to co-write a song for her, which became "Right Back Where We Started From". Tubbs asked her to sing on the demo; as she told the story in 2013, "he took it straight to United Artists Records [in London], and they loved it too. They paid me 100 pounds [... and after that,] they [offered] me an advance and a contract to finish recording the single."

After being released on United Artists Records (in Nightingale's true name), "Right Back Where We Started From" reached #8 in the UK in the autumn of 1975. It was released in the US early 1976 to enthusiastic reaction, reaching #2 on the Billboard Hot 100 in May 1976. Nightingale, who had accompanied her husband to his native Japan, was motivated by her single's US success to return to London to complete a Right Back Where We Started From album. She then proceeded to the US, which has since remained her home base.. Decades later, after the song had become the unofficial theme song in the 1970's from the Paul Newman starred movie Slap Shot about professional North American hockey, the New York Islanders adopted the song as their victory tune played at the end of every home win, which continues today in their new home the UBS Arena at the legendary Belmont racetrack (the longest and last leg of the 'triple crown' of the Kentucky Derby, the Preakness Stakes, and the mile-long Belmont Stakes). They have continued to play "Right Back" after every home win.

Later career
Nightingale's only significant UK hit in the period following the success of "Right Back Where We Started From" was with "Love Hit Me, the title cut from her second album. Promoted by Nightingale in a Top of the Pops appearance broadcast 17 March 1977, "Love Hit Me" peaked at #11 on the UK chart dated 9 April 1977.

Her third album Love Lines was a 1978 release in the UK and Europe with UK single releases "Lead Me On" and "(Bringing Out) The Girl in Me". Both were overlooked despite her promotion of the latter in another Top of the Pops appearance on 8 June 1978. The US release of "Lead Me On" early in 1979 met with a favorable reception, especially in the easy listening market, and the track reached #1 on Billboard's Easy Listening chart that July; the track gradually accrued enough mainstream pop support to reach #5 on the Hot 100 that September. As with "Right Back Where We Started From", she was unable to follow up her US Top Ten success, the subsequent "(Bringing Out) The Girl in Me" marking her final Hot 100 appearance with a #73 peak. Lead Me On is a re-packaged and slightly remixed version of the previous European LP with the addition of a new song, the disco-styled "Hideaway". The songs "Lead Me On" and "Hideaway" were extended for a promotional 12-inch record.

Nightingale reached the top 20 on Billboard'''s R&B chart for the first time in 1982 with "Turn to Me", a duet with Jimmy Ruffin. She then dropped out of the pop mainstream, working for some 20 years as a more jazz-oriented live performer. She has reportedly recorded an album of her live performance at B.B. King's Club at Universal Studios Hollywood although it remains unreleased. Since 2000, she has become active on the retro music circuit, appearing in the 2004 PBS music specials Superstars of Seventies Soul: Live and the 2012 My Music: 70s Soul Superstars.

DiscographyRight Back Where We Started From (1976)Night Life (1977)Love Lines (1979)Bittersweet (1980)It's a Beautiful Thing (1982) (US:#176), (US R&B:#35)Cry for Love'' (1986)

See also
List of disco artists (L-R)
List of black Britons
List of performers on Top of the Pops
List of acts who appeared on American Bandstand
List of artists who reached number one on the U.S. Adult Contemporary chart

Notes
1. Glen (aka Glenn) Nightingale subsequently played guitar in Boy George's band; his session credits include guitar work on recordings by Des'ree, Terence Trent D'Arby, the Gap Band, Jamiroquai and Junior co-writing the last named's "Do You Really (Want My Love)".
2. "Lead Me On" was #1 Easy Listening 7–21 July 1979; 4–8 August 1979; 1 September 1979.

References

External links

1952 births
Living people
20th-century Black British women singers
English women pop singers
English people of Guyanese descent
English rhythm and blues singers
English soul singers
Musicians from Wembley
Singers from London
United Artists Records artists